Thesdorf station is on the Hamburg-Altona–Kiel line and is a railway station served by the city trains of the Hamburg S-Bahn. The railway station is located in the town Pinneberg in the district of the same name, in Schleswig-Holstein, Germany.

Station layout
The station is an at-grade island platform with 2 tracks and an exit through a pedestrian underpass. The station is accessible for handicapped persons with a lift.

Station services

Trains
The rapid transit trains of the line S3 of the Hamburg S-Bahn  are calling the station. Direction of the trains on track 1 is Pinneberg. On track 2 the trains are traveling in the direction Stade via Hamburg central station.

Buses
A bus line is calling a bus stop in front.

Facilities at the station
No personnel is attending the station, but there are SOS and information telephones, ticket machines, 40 bicycle stands and 360 park and ride parking lots.

See also
Hamburger Verkehrsverbund HVV

References

External links
DB station information 
Network plan HVV (pdf) 

Hamburg S-Bahn stations in Schleswig-Holstein
Buildings and structures in Pinneberg (district)
Railway stations in Germany opened in 1967
1967 establishments in West Germany